The Xuetes (singular , also known as  and spelled as ) are a social group on the Spanish island of Majorca, in the Mediterranean Sea, who are descendants of Majorcan Jews that either were conversos (forcible converts to Christianity) or were Crypto-Jews, forced to keep their religion hidden. They practiced strict endogamy by marrying only within their own group. Many of their descendants observe a syncretist form of Christian worship known as Xueta Christianity.

The Xuetes were stigmatized up until the first half of the 20th century. In the latter part of the century, the spread of freedom of religion and laïcité reduced both the social pressure and community ties. An estimated 18,000 people in the island carry Xueta surnames in the 21st century, but only a small fraction of the society (including those with Xueta surnames) is aware of the complex history of this group.

Etymology of Xueta 
Other authors consider that it may derive from the word  (pronounced xuia or xua, which means a type of salted bacon and, by extension, pork) and, according to popular belief, refers to Xuetes who were seen eating pork to show that they did not practice Judaism. But this etymology has also been linked with the tendency, present in various cultures, of using offensive names related to pork to designate Jews and Jewish converts (see, for example ).

This neighbourhood is where the majority of the Xueta lived, and takes its name from a popular occupation of that group.

Xueta surnames 
The Xueta surnames are: Aguiló, Bonnin, Cortès, Fortesa, Fuster, Martí, Miró, Picó, Pinya/Piña, Pomar, Segura, Tarongí, Valentí, Valleriola and Valls; Picó and Segura are not found among those condemned by the Inquisition, nor is Valentí, which was originally the nickname of a family who were then known as Fortesa. Notice that many of those surnames are also very common in the general population of Catalan-speaking territories.

Surnames Galiana, Moyà and Sureda figure among the penitents without having been considered Xuetes.

Numerous surnames in Majorca with clear Jewish origin are present on the island yet are not considered to belong to the Xueta community. Examples are Abraham, Amar, Bofill, Bonet, Daviu, Duran, Homar, Jordà, Maimó, Salom, Vidal among others. Inquisition registers from the end of the 15th and beginning of the 16th century document more than 330 surnames among those persons condemned in Majorca.

Therefore, Converso origin is not sufficient to be considered Xueta. Although Xuetas are descendants of Conversos only a fraction of Converso descendants are considered Xuetas.

Xueta genetics
A variety of genetic studies conducted, principally, by the Departament of Human Genetics of the University of the Balearic Islands have indicated that the Xuetes constitute a genetically homogeneous group within the populations of Mizrahi Jews and are also related to Ashkenazi Jews and those of North Africa, based on analyzing both the Y chromosome, which traces patrilineal descent, and the mitochondrial DNA, which traces matrilineal descent.

Likewise, the population is subject to certain pathologies of genetic origin, such as Familial Mediterranean fever, shared with the Sephardi Jews and a high frequency of iron overload particular to that community.

Historic antecedents

The  (1391-1488) 

The assault on the  — the Majorcan Jewish ghettoes — in 1391, the preaching of Vincent Ferrer in 1413, and the conversion of the remainder of the Jewish community of Majorca, in 1435, constituted the three events that resulted in numerous . They had agreed to mass conversions in order to manage a collective peril rather than individual spiritual changes.

Many of the new Christians continued their traditional communal and religious practices. It largely replaced former Aljama in taking care of the group's social needs, for instance, assistance to the needy, an internal organ of justice, officiating at weddings, and supporting religious cohesion. At the end of the last quarter of the 15th century, the conversos carried on their activities, some of them clandestine, without suffering external pressures. The guilds did not discriminate based on Jewish origin. The conversos managed some social cohesion.

The beginnings of the Spanish Inquisition, (1488-1544) 

In 1488, while some of the last converts of 1435 were still alive, the first Inquisitors of the Spanish Inquisition — a tribunal newly created by the Catholic Monarchs as part of an effort to forge a nation state on the base of religious uniformity — arrived in Majorca. The introduction of such a tribunal was followed by public complaints and general opposition in Majorca, as throughout the rest of the Crown of Aragon, but it was useless. Their central objective was the repression of Crypto-Judaism, which they began by applying the Edicts of Grace, which allow severe punishment for heresy to be avoided through self-incrimination.

By the Edicts of Grace (1488–1492), 559 Majorcans confessed to Jewish practices and the Inquisition obtained the names of the majority of the Judaizing Majorcans, against whom, together with their families and their closest associates, they exercised a harsh punitive activity. Subsequently, until 1544, 239 Crypto-Jews were reconciled and 537 were "relaxed" — that is, turned over to the civil authorities to be executed — 82 of whom were effectively executed and burned. The majority of the remaining 455, who managed to flee, were burnt in effigy. This exile was distinct from the decree of expulsion of 1492, which did not apply to Majorca, which officially had no Jews left in it by 1435.

The new clandestinity (1545-1673) 
After this period, the Majorcan Inquisition ceased to act against the judaizers, even though there were signs of prohibited practices; the causes may have been: the participation of the inquisitorial structure in conflicts between local armed factions; the appearance of new religious phenomena such as some conversions to Islam and Protestantism or the control of the morality of the clergy. But, beyond a doubt, also the adoption of more efficacious strategies of protection on the part of the Crypto-Jews: the later inquisitorial trials talk about how religious practices were transferred within families when a child reached the age of adolescence and, very often in the case of the women, when it became clear whom she would marry and what were the husband's religious convictions.

But despite all of this, a small group persevered in their clandestine practices, essentially those who would later be known as the Xuetes, those who, furthermore, maintained and adopted social, familial, and economic strategies of internal cohesion.

From 1640, the descendants of the converts began a marked process of economic ascent and increasing commercial influence. Previously, and with some exceptions, they had been artisans, shopkeepers, and retail distributors, but starting from this time, and for reasons not well explained, some began to focus strongly on economic activity: they created complex mercantile companies, participated in foreign trade, coming to control, at the time of the end of the inquisitorial trials, 36% of the total, they dominated the market for insurance and retail commerce of imported products.

Because of the intense exterior economic activity, the Xuetes resumed their contact with the international communities of Jews, especially of Livorno, of Rome, of Marseille, and of Amsterdam, through whom the converts had access to Jewish literature.

An internal system of social stratification probably began in that period, although it is also believed to be a remnant of the Jewish (pre-conversion) period. This system distinguished a kind of aristocracy, called  (literally "high ears"), from the rest of the group,  ("low ears"). Along with other distinctions based on religion, professions, and parentage this configured a tapestry of alliances and avoidances among surnames, which had a great influence on endogamistic practices of the period.

Origins of the Xuetes

The second persecution (1673-1695) 
The reasons why the Inquisition returned to act against the judaizing Majorcans after some 130 years of inactivity, and in an era in which the inquisition was already in decline are not very clear: the preoccupation of decadent economic sectors before the ascent and commercial dynamism of the converts, the resumption of religious practices in community, rather than limited to a domestic context, a new growth of religious zeal, and the judgment against Alonso López could have been influential factors.

The precedents 
In July 1672, a merchant informed the Inquisition that some Jews of Livorno had made inquiries about the Jews of Majorca with the names "Forteses, Aguilons, Martins, Tarongins, Cortesos, Picons".

In 1673, a ship with a group of Jews expelled from Oran by the Spanish Crown and headed for Livorno, called in at Palma. The Inquisition arrested a youth of some 17 years named Isaac López. López had been born in Madrid and baptized with the name Alonso, and as a small boy fled to the Berber lands with his  parents. Alonso refused to renounce Judaism and was burnt alive in 1675. His execution provoked a great commotion among the "judaizers." At the same time he was also the object of great admiration for his persistence and courage.

The same year López was arrested, some servants of the  informed their confessor that they had spied upon their masters and observed them participating in Jewish ceremonies.

In 1674, the prosecutor of the Majorca tribunal sent a report to the Supreme Inquisition in which he accused the Majorcan Crypto-Jews of 33 charges, among them their refusal to marry  ("natural Christians") and their social rejection of those who did so; the practice of secrecy; the giving of Old Testament names to their children; the identification with their tribe of origin, and the arrangement of marriages as a function of that fact; the exclusion in their homes of the iconography of the New Testament and the presence of those of the Old; contempt for and insults toward Christians; exercising professions related to weights and measures in order to trick Christians; holding positions in the Church in order to mock them later with impunity; applying their own legal system; taking up collections for their own poor; financing a synagogue in Rome, where they had a representative; holding clandestine meetings; complying with Jewish dietary practices, including those of animal sacrifice and of fast days; the observance of the Jewish Sabbath; and avoidance of Last Rites at the time of death.

Conspiracism 

Four years later, in 1677, the Supreme Inquisition ordered the Majorcan Inquisition to act on the case of the confession of the servants. According to the servants, the observants, as they called themselves, in reference to the Torah, met in a garden in Palma where they observed Yom Kippur. This led to the detention of some of the leaders of the Crypto-Jewish community of Majorca, Pere Onofre Cortès (also known as Moixina), master of one of the servants and proprietor of the garden, along with five other people. From that point on, they proceeded to arrest 237 individuals in the course of a single year.

Helped by corrupt functionaries, the accused were able to arrange to only provide limited information in their own confessions and to denounce as few of their co-religionists as possible. All of the accused solicited the opportunity to return to the Church, and were reconciled.

Part of the penalty consisted of the confiscation of all of the goods of the condemned, which were valued at two million Majorcan lliura which, according to the usual procedures of the inquisition, had to be paid in actual currency. This constituted an exorbitant quantity for the era and, according to a protest of the Gran i General Consell, there was not this much hard cash on the entire island.

Finally, in the spring of 1679, five autos-da-fé took place, the first of which was preceded by the demolition of the building in the garden and the salting the earth where the conversos met. Before an expectant multitude, condemnation was pronounced against 221 conversos. Afterward, those who were condemned to prison were transported to serve out their sentences in new prisons erected by the Inquisition, and had their goods confiscated.

The Cremadissa (mass burning) 

Once the jail penalties were served, a great part of those who persisted in the Jewish faith, whose clandestine practices were noticed, harassed by inquisitorial vigilance and vexed by a society they considered responsible for the economic crisis provoked by the confiscations, decided to gradually flee the island in small groups.

In the middle of this process, an anecdotal event precipitated a new wave of inquisitions. Rafel Cortès, (also known as Cap loco or Crazy head), had remarried, this time with a woman with a converso surname, Miró, but who was Catholic. His family did not congratulate him on getting married and censured him for having married someone not of Jewish ancestry. Hurt in his pride, he denounced some of their coreligionists before the Inquisition of maintaining the prohibited faith. Suspecting that he had made a general denunciation, they agreed upon a mass escape. On 7 March 1688, a large group of converts embarked clandestinely on an English vessel, but unexpected rough weather prevented them from leaving, and at daybreak they returned to their houses. The Inquisition was notified of this, and all of the group was arrested.

The trials lasted three years and the cohesion of the group was weakened by a strict regime of isolation, which prevented any joint action, together with a perception of religious defeat due to the impossibility of escape. In 1691, the Inquisition, in three autos de fe, condemned 73 people, of whom 45 were turned over to the civil authorities to be burnt, 5 burnt in effigy; 3 already deceased had their bones burned, 37 were effectively punished; of these, three — Rafel Valls and the siblings Rafel Benet and Caterina Tarongí — were burned alive. 30,000 people attended.

The sentences dictated by the Inquisition included other penalties that were to be maintained for at least two generations: those in the household of the condemned, as well as their children and grandchildren, could not hold public offices, be ordained as priests, marry persons other than Xuetes, carry jewelry or ride a horse. These last two penalties do not appear to have been carried out, although the others continued in effect by the force of custom, beyond the two generations stipulated.

The final trials 
The Inquisition opened, and eventually closed, several trials of individuals denounced by the accused of the autos de fe of 1691, the majority dead. A single auto de fe was brought in 1695 against 11 dead people and one living woman (who was reconciled). Also, in the 18th century, the Inquisition carried out two individual trials: in 1718, Rafel Pinya spontaneously inculpated himself and was reconciled, and in 1720, Gabriel Cortès, (also known as Morrofés) fled to Alexandria and returned formally to Judaism; he was burnt in effigy as the last person condemned to death by the Majorcan Inquisition. There is no doubt that these last cases are anecdotal; with the trials of 1691 came the end of the Crypto-Jewry of Majorca. The effect of the escape of the leaders, the devastation of the mass burnings, and the generalized fear made it impossible to sustain the ancestral faith. It is after these events, we can begin to actually speak of the Xuetes.

Anti-Xueta propaganda

Faith Triumphant 

The same year as the autos de fe of 1691, Francesc Garau, Jesuit, theologian and active participant in the inquisitorial trials, published la Fee Triunfante en quatro autos celebrados en Mallorca por el Santo Oficio de la Inquisición en que an salido ochenta i ocho reos, i de treinta, i siete relaiados solo uvo tres pertinaces (Faith Triumphant in four acts celebrated in Majorca by the Holy Office of the Inquisition in which tried eighty-eight defendants, and of thirty-seven turned over to civil authorities only three remained stubborn). Apart from its importance as a documentary and historical source, the book was intended to perpetuate the record and the infamy of the converts, and it contributed notably to provide an ideological basis for the segregation of the Xuetes and to perpetuate it. It was republished in 1755, used in the argumentation to limit the civil rights of the Xuetes and served as the basis of the libel of 1857, La Sinagoga Balear o historia de los judios mallorquines (The Balearic Synagogue or the history of the Majorcan Jews). In the 20th century, there have been abundant republications, all with an intention contrary to that of its author, given that some passages were of scandalous crudity, and lack the most elementary sensibility.

Les gramalletes 

The gramalleta or sambenet was a tunic that individuals condemned by the Inquisition were forced to wear as punishment. The decorations on the gramalleta indicated what crime its bearer had committed and the punishment imposed. Once the autos-da-fé were over, a painting was created of the convicted heretic wearing the gramalleta and the name of its bearer was included in the painting. In the case of Majorca, these were exhibited publicly in the cloister of St. Domingo to perpetuate and exemplify the record of the verdict.

Because of the deterioration of this public display, the Supreme Inquisition ordered its renovation on several occasions in the 17th century. The matter led to conflict because of the presence of a great number of lineages, some of which coincided with those of the nobility, but finally in 1755 the order was carried out, surely because it was now restricted to the renovation of sambenets after 1645, and that the lineages thus implicated in Judaic practices were limited strictly to Xuetes, not the broader range of people prosecuted at an earlier date. The sambenets were to remain exposed until 1820, when a group of Xuetes assaulted and burned St. Domingo.

In the same year, 1755, in which Faith Triumphant was republished, another work was published as well, the Relación de los sanbenitos que se han puesto, y renovado este año de 1755, en el Claustro del Real Convento de Santo Domingo, de esta Ciudad de Palma, por el Santo Oficio de la Inquisición del Reyno de Mallorca, de reos relaxados, y reconciliados publicamente por el mismo tribunal desde el año de 1645 (The relation of the sanbenitos that have been placed, and renovated this year of 1755, in the cloister of the royal convent of Santo Domingo, of this city of Palma, by the Holy Office of the Inquisition of the Kingdom of Majorca, of defendants relaxados, and reconciled publicly by the same tribunal from the year 1645), to insist on the necessity of not forgetting, despite the active opposition of those affected.

The Xueta community 
The attitude of the Inquisition, which intended to force the disappearance of the Jews by means of their forcible integration into the Christian community, in fact accomplished the opposite: it perpetuated the memory of the condemned and, by extension, of all who carried the infamous lineages, even if they were not relatives and even if they were sincere Christians, and helped create a community that, although it no longer contained Judaic element, was still obliged to maintain a strong cohesion. In contrast, the descendants of the island's other crypto-Jews, those who were not so brought to the public view, lost all notion of their origins.

But, soon after, the Xuetes regained the leading role that they had before the inquisitorial trials. Now, deprived of their religious network, and their fortunes having been requisitioned, they sought to protect commercial alliances with the nobility and the clergy, even with the functionaries of the Inquisition. The renewed energy and the political alliances achieved permitted them to fight actively for equal rights, adjusting to whatever the surrounding circumstances were.

The War of the Spanish Succession (1705-1715) 
As with the rest of the island's population during the War of the Spanish Succession, amongst Xuetes there were both maulets — supporters of the Habsburg Charles VI, Holy Roman Emperor and botiflers — supporters of the Bourbon Philip V of Spain. Some of the latter perceived the French dynasty as a modernizing element in terms of religion and society, since Bourbon France had never exhibited an attitude of repression and discrimination comparable to the Habsburg rule in Spain, renewed — in the case of Majorca — with Charles II.

Thus, a group of Xuetes, led by Gaspar Pinya, clothing dealer and importer, supplier of the botifler nobility, was very active supporting Philip's cause. In 1711, a conspiracy financed by Pinya was discovered. He was sentenced to jail and his properties seized but, as the war ended with a Bourbon victory, he was rewarded with rights associated to the lesser nobility; this did not affect the rest of the community.

The republication of Faith Triumphant (1755) 

The tailor Rafel Cortes, Tomàs Forteza and the hunchback Jeroni Cortès, among others, raised a request to the Real Audiencia de Mallorca (Royal Majorcan High Court, the island's highest court) aiming to prevent the republication of Faith Triumphant in 1755, which was accepted and so the book's distribution prevented for a time. Eventually, the Inquisitors allowed distribution to be resumed.

The deputies of the Carrer (1773-1788) 

In 1773, the Xuetes designated a group of six deputies — popularly known by the name of "perruques" (the wigs) because of the luxurious adornment they used during their lobbying — in order to address King Charles III to make a claim for outright social and juridical equality with other Majorcans. In this regard, the Court decided to inquire of the Majorcan institutions, which frontally and decidedly opposed the pretensions of the descendants of the conversos. A lengthy and costly trial followed, in which the parties passionately stated their cases. The documents used in this trial demonstrate the extent to which discrimination was alive and had deep ideological roots; conversely, they are also a proof of the perseverance of the Xuetes in their demands for equality.

In October 1782, the prosecutor of the Real Audiencia de Mallorca, despite being aware of the result of these deliberations favorable to the Xuetes, raised a memorandum including highly racist reasoning, proposing the suspension of the accord and the exile of the Xuetes to Menorca and to Cabrera, where they would be confined with strong restrictions on their liberty.

Finally, the king inclined, timidly, in favor of the Xuetes: on 29 November 1782 he signed the Real Cédula (Royal Decree) that decreed liberty of movement and residency, the elimination of all architectonic elements that distinguished the Segell district, and the prohibition of insults, mistreatment, and the use of denigrating expressions. Also, with reservations, the king showed himself to be favorable to the establishment of outright professional liberty and the participation of the Xuetes in the navy and army, but gave instructions that these dispositions would not take effect until some time had passed in order to allow the controversy to ease.

Before half a year had passed, the deputies insisted again on Xuetes gaining access to whatever occupation they sought, and reported that the insults and discrimination had not stopped. The deputies also complained about the exhibition of the sambenets at St. Domingo. The king designated a panel to study the problem; the panel proposed the withdrawal of the sambenets; the prohibition of Faith Triumphant; the dispersion throughout the city, if necessary by force, of the Xuetes and the elimination of all formal mechanisms of mutual assistance among them; access without restriction to all ecclesiastical, university and military positions; the abolition of the guilds; and the suppression of the statutes of "purity of blood", and, if this were not possible, to limit these to 100 years; these last two were proposed to be applied throughout the kingdom.

Then began a new period of consultations and a new trial, which generated in October 1785 a second Cédula Real, which largely ignored the panel's proposal, and was limited to allowing access to the army and the civil administration. Finally, in 1788, a final disposition established simple equality in the exercise of whatever office, but still without a word about the university nor ecclesiastical positions. That same year, the Court and the General Inquisition took action intended to withdraw the sambenets from the cloister, but without result.

Probably the most palpable effect of the Cédulas Reales was the slow disarticulation of the Segell community (el Carrer). Instead, there came to be small nuclei of Xuetes among the majority of the population and, timidly, some began to establish themselves in other streets and neighbourhoods. For those remaining at Segell, the same attitudes of social discrimination, matrimonial endogamy and traditional professions were kept but, in any case, segregation was overt and public in the world of education and religion, bastions untouched by the reforms of Charles III.

The end of the Old Regime (1812-1868) 
Majorca was not occupied during the Napoleonic invasion and, in contrast to the liberalism that dominated the new Spanish Constitution of 1812, the island became a refuge for those whose ideology was most intransigent and favorable to the Old Regime. In this context, in 1808, soldiers who had been mobilized to go to the front accused the Xuetes of being responsible for their mobilization, and assaulted the Segell district.

The 1812 Constitution, in effect through 1814, abolished the Inquisition and established the full civil equality that the Xuetes had long sought; consequently, the most active Xuetes joined the liberal cause. In 1820, when the Constitution was restored, a group of Xuetes attacked the headquarters of the Inquisition and the Santo Domingo monastery, burning the archives and the sambenets. In turn, when the Constitution was again abolished in 1823, the Carrer was again raided and the shops looted. Such episodes were frequent during this period, as were similar incidents elsewhere on the island, with riots taking place in Felanitx, Llucmajor, Pollença, Sóller, and Campos, Majorca.

In 1836, Onofre Cortès was appointed councilor of the Palma town hall; it was the first time since the 16th century that a Xueta had occupied a public office at such a level. Since then, it has been a regular occurrence that a Xueta holds a public office in the townhall and the Diputación Provincial.

In 1857, La sinagoga balear o historia de los judios de Mallorca (The Balearic synagogue or the history of the Jews of Majorca) was published and signed by Juan de la Puerta Vizcaino. A good part of this book reproduced Faith Triumphant and would be replicated a year later with the work Un milagro y una mentira. Vindicación de los mallorquines cristianos de estirpe hebrea (A miracle and a lie. Vindication of the Majorcan Christians of Hebrew lineage).

Although the ideological duality within the Xueta community can be traced back to a time prior to the inquisitorial trials, it was in this context of violent sudden changes that it became clear that one faction, clearly a minority, yet influential, was declaredly liberal, later republican, and moderately anticlerical, fighting for the liquidation of all traces of discrimination; and another, probably the majority, yet almost imperceptible in historical records, was ideologically conservative, fervently religious, and wanted to go as unnoticed as possible. At root, both strategies wished to attain the same goal: the disappearance of the Xueta issue, although they wanted to resolve it in different ways: one by making the injustice visible and the other by blending into the surrounding society.

Coinciding with these progressive periods, the Xuetes formed social clubs and associations of mutual aid; it is also during this time that they gained positions  in political institutions via the liberal parties.

From the First Republic to the Second Republic (1869-1936) 
Once they could, some well-off families gave their children a high degree of intellectual education and played an important part in the artistic movements of the period. Xuetes took a leading role in the Renaixença (the revival of Catalan culture), in the defense of the Catalan language and in the recuperation of the Floral Games (Catalan/Balear literary competitions). A forerunner of this revival was Tomàs Aguiló i Cortès at the beginning of the 19th century, and some prominent successors were Tomàs Aguiló i Forteza, Marian Aguiló i Fuster, Tomàs Forteza i Cortès, and Ramón Picó i Campamar.

Josep Tarongí (1847–1890), priest and writer, encountered difficulties in studying and graduating, but was ultimately ordained; because of his Xueta extraction, he obtained a position outside Majorca. He was the protagonist of the greatest 19th century polemic on the Xueta question: when he was forbidden in 1876 to preach at the church of St. Miquel, this began a polemic with Miquel Maura (also an ecclesiastic), brother of the politician Antonio Maura, in which many other parties participated, and which had a great impact both on and off of the island.

Between January and October 1923, the Xueta urbanist and politician Guillem Forteza Pinya was mayor of Palma. Also, between 1927 and 1930, during the dictatorship of Primo de Rivera, that office was held by Joan Aguiló Valentí and Rafel Ignaci Cortès Aguiló.

The brief period of the Second Spanish Republic was also important both because of the official laïcism and because a good number of the Xuetes sympathized with the new model of the state, much as their forebears had sympathized with the ideas of the Enlightenment and the liberals. During the Republic, for the first time a Xueta priest preached a sermon at the cathedral of Palma; this had great symbolic importance.

From the Spanish Civil War to present times (1936-early 21st C.) 
Anti-Xueta prejudice continued to diminish with the opening of the island to tourism in the first decades of the 20th century, along with economic development which started by the end of the previous century. The presence—in many cases, the permanent residency—of outsiders on the island (Spaniards or foreigners) to whom the status of the Xuetes meant nothing, marked a definite point of inflection in the history of this community.

Also, in 1966, the publication of the book Els descendents dels Jueus Conversos de Mallorca. Quatre mots de la veritat (The descendants of the converted Jews of Majorca. Four words of truth), by Miguel Forteza Piña, brother of mayor Guillem, which made public the researches of Baruch Braunstein at the National Historical Archive in Madrid (published in the United States in the 1930s) regarding inquisitorial archives that demonstrated that in Majorca those condemned for judaizing affected more than 200 Majorcan surnames; this raised the last popular controversy over the Xueta question. It was in this moment when discriminatory attitudes ended up marginalized in the private dimension and their public expression virtually disappeared.

Freedom of religion, while restricted to private practice of religion only, was legally introduced at the end of the Franco era. This made it possible for some of the Xuetes to reestablish contact with Judaism. It was also enhanced during the 1960s in some revivalist movements which did not go further than the case of Nicolau Aguiló, who in 1977 emigrated to Israel and returned to Judaism with the name Nissan Ben-Avraham, later obtaining the title of rabbi. In any case, Judaism and the Xuetes have had a relation of a certain ambivalence in that dealing with Jews who have adhered to a Christian tradition had been a matter not contemplated by the political and religious authorities of Israel. They seem to give importance to the fact of the Xuetes being "of Christian tradition", while for those Xuetes interested in some form of drawing closer to world Jewry, their differentiated existence is explained only by the fact of their being "Jews". Perhaps this duality explains the existence of a syncretic Judæo-Christian cult called Xueta Christianity, although very much a minority, preached by Cayetano Martí Valls.

An important event, with the advent of democracy, was the election in 1979 of Ramon Aguiló (of direct Xueta ancestry), re-elected socialist mayor of Palma until 1991, whose election by popular vote could be considered the principal evidence of the decline of discrimination, ratified by other cases, such as that of Francesc Aguiló, mayor of Campanet.

All of this, however, does not imply a complete elimination of rejection of the Xuetes, as is indicated by a poll conducted by the University of the Balearic Islands in 2001, in which 30% of Majorcans affirmed that they would not marry a Xueta, and 5% declared that they would not even want to have Xuetes as friends, numbers that, despite being high, are nuanced in that those in favor of discrimination tend to be seniors.

Immigration in the early 21st century is stimulating renewed activity in the community, including at the Palma synagogue, involving newcomers and Chuetas. A son of the community, Rabbi Nissan Ben-Avraham returned to Spain in 2010 after being ordained as a rabbi in Israel.

Recognition 
In 2011 Rabbi Nissim Karelitz, a leading rabbi and halachic authority and chairman of the Beit Din Tzedek rabbinical court in Bnei Brak, Israel, recognized the Chuetas of Palma de Majorca as Jewish.

Notes

References 
This article is largely based on the corresponding article in the Catalan-language Wikipedia, accessed 9 February 2007. That article gives the following references:
 The Jews of Majorca. Isaacs, A. Lionel. London: Methuen 1936. Catalan translation: 
 The chuetas of Mallorca. Conversos and the Inquisition of Mallorca. Braustein, Bàruch. New York: Ktav Publishing House, Inc. . Catalan translation: 
 A Dead Branch on the Tree of Israel (in 5 pens in hand). Graves, Robert. New York: Doubleday 1958. Catalan translation: 
 The Conversos of Majorca: Life and Death in a Crypto-Jewish Community in XVII Century. Selke, Angela. Jerusalem: Hispania Judaica Series. . Spanish translation. ed. Taurus.
 Those of the street: the Catholic-Jews of Mallorca. Moore, Kenneth. Indiana: University of Notre Dame Press. . Spanish translation: .
 Lourde alliance. Marriage et identité chez les descendants de juifs convertis à Majorque (1435-1750), Porqueres i Gené, Enric; París 1995, Ed. Kime, . Catalan translation: 
 La fe triunfante. Garau, Francisco; Perez, Llorenç (proleg); Muntaner, Lleonard (versió i estudi preliminar). Palma (Mallorca): Imagen/70. 1984
 Religión y economía. Los chuetas y la Inquisición mallorquina. Nuevos documentos. Cortijo Ocaña, Antonio, & M. Durán-Cogan. Santa Barbara: Publications of eHumanista. 2011. 
 Algo sobre el estado religioso y social de la isla de Mallorca. Tarongí Cortès, José. Palma (Mallorca): Miquel Font, editor. 
 Historia de los judios mallorquines y de sus descendientes cristianos. Cortès Cortès, Gabriel; Serra, Antoni (estudi preliminar). Palma (Mallorca): Miquel Font, editor. 
 Anales judaicos de Mallorca. Anonymous; Lorenzo Pérez (transcripción, introducción y notas). Palma (Mallorca): Luis Ripoll, editor. 1974 
 El mito triunfante: estudio antropológico-social de los chuetas mallorquines. Laub, Juan i Eva; Lisón Tolosana, Carmelo (pròleg). Palma (Mallorca): Miquel Font, editor. 
 Els descendents dels jueus conversos de Mallorca. Quatre mots de la veritat. Forteza Pinya, Miquel. Palma (Mallorca): Editorial Moll. 1972.
 Xuetes, nobles i capellans (segles XVII-XVIII). Porqueres, Enric i Riera, Francesc. Palma (Mallorca): Lleonard Muntaner, editor. 
 Les lluites antixuetes del segle XVIII. Riera i Montserrat, Francesc. Palma (Mallorca): Editorial Moll. 
 Sobre jueus i conversos de les Balears. Muntaner, Lleonard, Vidal, José Juan et alt. Palma (Mallorca): Lleonard Muntaner, editor. 
 Les cartes romanes de Mossen Pinya. Cortès, Gabriel i Pinya, Roman. Palma (Mallorca): UIB. 
 La causa xueta a la cort de Carles III. Riera i Montserrat, Francesc; Porqueres Gené, Enric (pr.). Palma (Mallorca): Lleonard Muntaner, editor. 
 El comerç exterior de Mallorca. Homes mercats i produces d’intercanvi (1650–1720). Bibiloni Amengual, Andreu. Palma (Mallorca): El Tall editorial. 
 Companyies i mercat assegurador a Mallorca (1650–1715). Pons Pons, Jerònia. Palma (Mallorca): El Tall editorial. 
 Els xuetes mallorquins: quinze segles de racisme. Porcel, Baltasar. Barcelona edicions 62. 
 Els xuetes de Mallorca: grups de poder i critojudaisme al segle XVII. Picazo Muntaner, Antoni. Palma (Mallorca): El Tall. .
 La nissaga d’un xueta. Cortès, Llorenç. Palma (Mallorca): Lleonard Muntaner, editor. 
 Els malnoms dels xuetes de Mallorca. Planas Ferrer, Rosa. Pons i Pons; Damià (pròleg). Palma (Mallorca): Lleonard Muntaner, editor. 
 Els xuetes des de la intolerancia a la llibertat. Riera i Montserrat, Francesc. Palma (Mallorca): Lleonard Muntaner, editor. 
 Els anussim. El problema dels xuetons segons la legislació rabínica. Ben-Avraham, Nissan. Palma (Mallorca): Miquel Font, editor, editor. 
 Arrels xuetes, ales jueves. Segura Aguiló, Miquel. Palma (Mallorca): Lleonard Muntaner, editor. 
 Segell. Revista d’Història i cultura jueva''. núm. 1 d.a. Palma (Mallorca): Lleonard Muntaner, editor.

External links 
Memoria del carrer
ARCA-Llegat Jueu
Institut Rafel Valls
Segell
Red de Juderias de España

Groups claiming Jewish descent
People from Mallorca
 
Jewish Spanish history
Crypto-Jews
History of Mallorca